Rashida Strober is an American playwright and dark-skin activist.

Strober is known for her to play A Dark Skinned Woman's Revenge about her experiences as a dark-skinned Caribbean-American woman. The play debuted in St. Petersburg, Florida, in 2011. The play was later adapted into a book.

Strober is also a "dark skin activist" working for the acceptance of dark-skinned people.

References

21st-century American dramatists and playwrights
21st-century American women writers
Activists for African-American civil rights
African-American dramatists and playwrights
American women dramatists and playwrights
Living people
Year of birth missing (living people)
21st-century African-American women writers
21st-century African-American writers